The final of the Men's 400 metres Individual Medley event at the European LC Championships 1997 was held on Wednesday 20 August 1997 in Seville, Spain.

Finals

Qualifying heats

Remarks

See also
1996 Men's Olympic Games 400m Individual Medley
1997 Men's World Championships (SC) 400m Individual Medley

References
 scmsom results
 La Gazetta Archivio
 swimrankings

M